El Chanfle 2, also known as El Chanfle II or El Chanfle Segundo, is a 1982 Mexican sports comedy film written, directed, and starring by Roberto Gómez Bolaños known as Chespirito and it served as sequel to the 1979 film El Chanfle. The film was location in Mexico City and other locations from Mexico.

Cast
Roberto Gómez Bolaños as Chanfle and Dr. Chapatin
Florinda Meza as Tere
Rubén Aguirre as Mr. Matute
Raúl 'Chato' Padilla as Paco
Edgar Vivar as Dr. Nájera
María Antonieta de las Nieves as Diana
Angelines Fernández as Paco's wife
Sergio Ramos as Secudo
Benito Raúl Ibarra as Henchman
Horacio Gómez Bolaños as Gangster
César Sobrevals as Argentinian customs clerk

References

External links 
 

Mexican sports comedy films
Metro-Goldwyn-Mayer films
1982 films
1980s sports comedy films
Films shot in Mexico
1980s Spanish-language films
1982 comedy films
1980s Mexican films